Charles Trevanion,  1594 to  1660, was an English landowner and politician, who was MP for Cornwall in 1625 and Sheriff from 1633 to 1634. He supported the Royalist cause during the First English Civil War, his eldest son John Trevanion being killed in 1643.

Personal details 

Charles Trevanion was born around 1594, eldest son of Charles Trevanion (died 1601) of Caerhays Castle and his wife Joan Wichalse ( 1568-1598). One of the largest landowners in Cornwall, his father controlled several seats in Parliament, served as Vice-Admiral of Cornwall and was High Sheriff of Cornwall in 1596. When he died in 1601, Trevanion inherited nearly 8,000 acres of land around the village of St Michael Caerhays.

Sometime before 1613, he married Amia Mallet, daughter of Sir John Mallet of Enmore; they had two sons and a daughter, including John Trevanion (1613-1643), who was killed in the Storming of Bristol.

Career

Trevanion attended Oriel College, Oxford in 1611 and became a local Justice of the Peace in 1617. Elected for Cornwall in 1625, he did not stand again but his extensive estates gave him influence over the Parliamentary seats of Grampound, Tregony and St Mawes. This fact made him a substantial player in Cornish politics for the next thirty years.

Although Trevanion supported the Parliamentary opposition in the debate over the Petition of Right, his son John was one of  59 MPs named as "betrayers of their country" in May 1641 for voting against the Bill of Attainder for Strafford. When the First English Civil War began in August 1642,

References

Sources
 
 
 

Members of the Parliament of England (pre-1707) for Cornwall
High Sheriffs of Cornwall
English MPs 1625
Alumni of Oriel College, Oxford
Royalist military personnel of the English Civil War
Military personnel from Cornwall